Fritz Theilen  (27 September 1927 – 18 April 2012)  was a German member of the anti-Nazi resistance group the Edelweißpiraten during World War II. Born to working-class parents, he joined the Deutsches Jungvolk division of the Hitler Youth in 1937, and was excluded for resisting orders in 1940. He started an apprenticeship at the local Ford Motor Company auto plant in 1941. In 1942 he joined the Edelweißpiraten. He was imprisoned at the Gestapo's Cologne headquarters—the EL-DE Haus—in 1943. After managing to escape from prison, he survived in the underground until 1945. Ford only re-employed him after the British occupation force exerted pressure on the company's management.

References

1927 births
2012 deaths
German resistance members
Hitler Youth members